The Ministry of Darkness was a villainous professional wrestling stable in the World Wrestling Federation (WWF, now WWE) in 1999 during the Attitude Era. Led by The Undertaker, the Ministry was a controversial group with pseudo-witchcraft-themed storylines that included rituals and sacrifices.

History

Formation 
After Paul Bearer turned his back on his son Kane and rejoined the side of Kane's brother The Undertaker at the Judgment Day: In Your House pay-per-view event in October 1998, The Undertaker announced The Ministry of Darkness and a "plague of evil" that would be unleashed on the WWF the next night on Raw Is War, making Undertaker a heel. Since then, The Undertaker continued to feud with Kane and Stone Cold Steve Austin, which involved segments in which Undertaker hit Austin in the head with a shovel giving him a storyline concussion, thus costing Austin the WWF Championship against The Rock. The following week on Raw Is War, interviews were conducted with Austin throughout the night in his hospital room in a medical center in the San Jose, California area, where the night before at a WWF live event Austin blacked out, as part of the storyline in the lead up to their Buried Alive match.

Later, The Undertaker and Paul Bearer abducted Austin, at first attempting to bury Austin alive, then attempting to embalm him alive. However, before Undertaker could begin the embalming process, Kane came in through the embalming room door and attacked Undertaker, preventing the embalming from happening. On that week's Sunday Night Heat, Undertaker said that Austin would be sacrificed, but on Raw Is War instead Undertaker called out Kane, they fought and he called out Bearer, who had brought the orderlies out to the ring and Kane escaped. Backstage, Undertaker knocked Kane out with a chair shot and told Bearer to go get the orderlies and Undertaker tried to wrap Kane in a body bag as punishment, but failed when Austin hit Undertaker in the head with a shovel, knocking him out in the process as his measure of payback for hitting him in the head earlier and costing him the WWF Championship. It was assumed that Undertaker attempted to have his brother committed to the mental asylum because Kane saved Austin from the embalming process in the funeral home earlier on Raw Is War. However, Austin put the fake Kane mask on Undertaker, fooling everybody to think that Kane was going to the mental asylum, but unbeknownst to Bearer and the orderlies, Undertaker, the actual fool the entire time, was going to the asylum instead of Kane and later dumped Bearer into the sewer. Also, Undertaker tied Austin down on his symbol and crucified Austin as payback for sending him to the asylum and escaping from the embalming room weeks earlier. Undertaker's vile schemes were delayed when Kane cost him the Buried Alive match to Austin at Rock Bottom: In Your House on December 13 and he was not seen until the following month.

Meanwhile, Bradshaw and Faarooq formed The Acolytes, a dark and brooding tag team briefly managed by The Jackyl. Shortly after their debut, the Jackyl would mention on color commentary that his acolytes would usher in "an age of tribulation" in the WWF and that the Jackyl would be the "puppet master" controlling everything from the shadows, effectively setting the stage for The Ministry of Darkness with the Jackyl acting as the power behind the throne. However, The Jackyl left WWF at the end of 1998, just before Bradshaw and Faarooq came under the service of a then-unknown new leader.

As one of their first orders of business, they abducted Dennis Knight on the December 28 episode of Raw Is War and took him to a renewed, druid-like master "He" which they were referring to. Weeks later, this "He" turned out to be The Undertaker, who, along with Paul Bearer, proceeded to initiate Knight as his servant via a ritual, renaming him as Mideon. At the Royal Rumble event in January 1999, The Undertaker, Mideon and The Acolytes abducted the 485-pound Mabel, who was renamed Viscera the following night on Raw Is War and turned him to the Undertaker's side. Another faction, The Brood (Christian, Edge and Gangrel), was recruited to The Undertaker's service as well and then Undertaker made it clear that he wanted to own the WWF and oust Vince McMahon.

First strike 
During this time, Mr. McMahon started claiming that Mark Calaway (Undertaker's real name) was taking his gimmick too far and that Calaway actually believed that he was in fact The Undertaker and that he was the second coming of the Lord of Darkness. McMahon, shook up, put Undertaker in the second-ever Inferno match, a rematch in which Undertaker faced off against Kane (who had joined Vince's Corporation to avoid being committed to the asylum). Undertaker defeated Kane again, this time by placing his leg on fire and reduced the WWF owner to tears at the sight of a burning teddy bear. The bear was later said to have once belonged to Stephanie McMahon as a child.

For weeks, Undertaker revealed that his Ministry actually took orders from a "greater power" and kept talking about a higher power who apparently owned the key to McMahon's heart and soul. Undertaker and the Ministry trespassed on McMahon's property, leaving a burning crucifix resembling The Undertaker's symbol in McMahon's front yard and McMahon ordered his enforcer, Big Bossman, to face The Undertaker in a Hell in a Cell match at WrestleMania XV on March 28, which Undertaker won. After the match, The Brood lowered themselves from the rafters onto the top of the cell and then lowered a noose to Undertaker, who sent McMahon another message by hanging the Bossman from the cell.
d
After WrestleMania XV, the mysterious woman in the storyline was revealed to be McMahon's own daughter Stephanie. The Ministry took Stephanie captive that night and Corporation member Ken Shamrock found her crying in the boiler room and with The Undertaker's symbol on her forehead. As vengeance on Shamrock for ruining his plans, Undertaker ordered The Ministry to abduct Ken's storyline sister Ryan and sacrifice her on one of his symbols as a demonstration on Undertaker's part of what would happen to Stephanie and McMahon was enraged, screaming at the camera and telling Undertaker to stay away from Stephanie. The next week on Raw Is War, Shamrock found his sister crying in the basement along with Mankind, but was ambushed, attacked along with Mankind as well, captured and attempted to be sacrificed by The Ministry of Darkness. Since Ken forced some of it out of Christian, Undertaker flogged him as punishment for giving the information to Shamrock that Stephanie was in the boiler room and the next week he tried to sacrifice Shamrock and then ordered Christian's fellow Brood members Edge and Gangrel to sacrifice him as well for his incompetence, but instead they refused and turned on The Undertaker and left the stable. This defection of The Brood was the only voluntary defection from the group during its tenure.

The Corporate Ministry 

At Backlash on April 25, Mr. McMahon had Shamrock face The Undertaker in the hopes that Shamrock would break Undertaker's ankle with his ankle lock toehold submission, but his plan backfired and Shamrock was attacked by Bradshaw after the match. Later, The Undertaker commandeered Stephanie McMahon's limo and shouting to her "Where to, Stephanie?" while laughing and drove off into the night with a screaming Stephanie in tow as Backlash went off the air. The next night on Raw Is War, Undertaker held a "Black Wedding" for himself and Stephanie because if he married the WWF owner's daughter, he would control the entire WWF. His wish was about to come to fruition, until the ceremony was ruined successfully by Stone Cold Steve Austin, after two attempts by Corporation members Big Show  and Ken Shamrock failed.

As a result, on the very first ever episode of SmackDown!, The Undertaker proceeded to join forces with Vince McMahon's son Shane, in turn gaining control of The Corporation and merging his Ministry with it to form the even more powerful Corporate Ministry. However, after Mr. McMahon was revealed as its "Greater Power" on the June 7 episode of Raw, The Corporate Ministry would eventually dissolve. The Undertaker formed a new "Unholy Alliance" with Big Show (Mideon and Viscera later helped them as well) which led to two WWF Tag Team Championship reigns for Big Show and Undertaker. This group came to an end when The Undertaker suffered a legit injury in September and was written out by quitting, rather than taking a match ordered by Mr. McMahon. On Judgement day 2000, Undertaker made his American Badass debut in WWF.

Aftermath and legacy 
In 2004, during the final three SmackDown! shows prior to The Undertaker and Bradshaw (now under the gimmick of JBL, the initialism of John Bradshaw Layfield) facing off at No Mercy for the WWE Championship in a Last Ride match, a series of Ministry-reminiscent events occurred between Undertaker and his former servant:
 On the September 16, 2004 episode of SmackDown!, JBL called out The Undertaker. When Undertaker came out and had JBL cornered, Gangrel and Viscera appeared and took out Undertaker from behind, commencing an assault by the foursome of Gangrel, JBL, Orlando Jordan and Viscera (however, Orlando Jordan was not a former member of the Ministry).
 The September 23 episode of SmackDown! saw Gangrel and Viscera, introduced as the Ministry, face Undertaker in a handicap match, which was won by Undertaker.
 On the September 30 episode of SmackDown!, JBL faced Hardcore Holly. Undertaker had a vignette with the hearse telling JBL to prepare to take his last ride and rest in peace at No Mercy. In an interview after that and prior to the match, JBL had asked where was Orlando Jordan, who was not with him. Following a preemptive assault by Holly, JBL came out for the match. During the match, he assaulted Holly with a weapon, getting disqualified, after which yet another Undertaker vignette interrupted him. Undertaker revealed Orlando hung high in the stands, crucified on his symbol.

JBL would beat The Undertaker at No Mercy with interference from Jon Heidenreich to retain the WWE Championship. During this series, the SmackDown! announcers mentioned Gangrel and Viscera's former Ministry status, but never during the entire Undertaker/JBL feud was it brought up that Bradshaw used to be a part of the Ministry. Instead, the excuse given for Gangrel and Viscera's insert was that "JBL paid them off". However, at The Great American Bash in July 2006, as JBL was calling the match between Big Show and Undertaker, JBL mentioned that he had fought The Undertaker for the WWE Championship and had been on his side in The Ministry of Darkness.

Edge, another member of the Ministry, debuted a new gimmick similar to the Ministry in 2022 during the feud against A.J. Styles. This would lead to the formation of his stable known as The Judgment Day, consisting of himself, Damian Priest, Rhea Ripley and Finn Balor, who usurped Edge's leadership by expelling him from the group. Dominik Mysterio would later join the stable.

Members 
 The Undertaker (leader) (October 19, 1998 - September 23, 1999)
 Shane McMahon (Ministry's Mole within The Corporation)
 Bradshaw &  Faarooq (bodyguards) (December 28, 1998)
 Mideon (January 11, 1999 - September 23, 1999)
 Viscera (January 24, 1999 - September 23, 1999)
 The Brood (Edge, Christian, and Gangrel) (February 1, 1999)
 Big Show (July 26 - September 23, 1999)

Championships and accomplishments 
The championship and accomplishments of both the Ministry and Corporate Ministry.
 World Wrestling Federation
 WWF Championship (1 time) – The Undertaker
 WWF European Championship (1 time) – Mideon
 WWF Tag Team Championship (2 times) – The Acolytes

See also 
 The Disciples of the New Church
 The Dungeon of Doom

References

External links 
 The Undertaker's WWE Profile
 John "Bradshaw" Layfield (JBL)'s WWE Profile
 Ron "Faarooq" Simmons' WWE Profile
 Edge's WWE Profile
 Christian's WWE Profile
 PercyPringle.com (Official Website of Paul Bearer)

Fictional cults
WWE teams and stables
The Undertaker